Leigh , historically spelled Lyghe, is a village and a civil parish located in the Sevenoaks district of Kent, England. It is located six miles (10 km) south of Sevenoaks town and three miles (5 km) west of Tonbridge.

There is a large village green; nearby is Hall Place, once Leigh Hall, occasionally open to the public, built in 1876. The parish church (13th century) is dedicated to St Mary.

History 
The name of the village derives from the Old English leah, meaning a forest glade or clearing.

Leigh is thought to have grown from a hamlet, evidence of which dates back to the late 11th century. Much of the land around the village was acquired in the 14th century by Sir John de Pulteney, owner of nearby Penshurst Place. In 1533, the estate passed to the Sidney family who retained ownership of most of this land until the early 20th century.
 
The village grew substantially in the 19th century when the Baily and Morley families built many of the distinctive buildings present today, including Hall Place, East and Old Lodges, The Square, Forge Square and School Master's House. The Tonbridge to Redhill railway was built in 1842 to the south of the village, bringing further growth in population.

Government 
Leigh is administered by Sevenoaks District Council and Kent County Council. It falls within the UK parliamentary constituency of Tonbridge and Malling.

The parish of Leigh also includes the hamlet of Charcott as well as the Old Powder Mills and Moorden.

Community facilities

The Fleur De Lis is the only public house in the village itself, although the Plough Inn is located to the east of the village on Powder Mill Lane. The Fleur De Lis was originally built as cottages by Thomas Baily in 1855, but was bought by a local brewery, Bartrum and Company, in 1870.

Transport

Leigh railway station is on the Redhill to Tonbridge line and is located to the south of the village centre. It opened as "Leigh Halt" in 1911 but has been named "Leigh" since 1969.

The former Penshurst Airfield was located within the parish, to the south of Charcott. It operated mainly as a military airfield in 1916–1936 and 1940–1946. The remaining buildings were removed in 1991.

Local places of interest
 St Mary's Church, Leigh

Notable people
Amy Catherine Walton (1849–1939), writer of noted Christian literature for children, moved to Leigh with her priest husband, Octavius Frank Walton, in 1906. He retired in 1918, but they soon moved back.

See also
 October 1926 Air Union Blériot 155 crash, which was within Leigh parish

References

External links

 Leigh Parish Council website
 Village notes Check for villages starting with L
 St Mary's church
 Leigh & District Historical Society
 Leigh during the Second World War
 Leigh barrier

Villages in Kent
Civil parishes in Kent